Carl-Henrik Norin (27 March 1920, Västerås – 23 May 1967, Stockholm) was a Swedish jazz saxophonist.

Norin first began playing professionally in the early 1940s, including with Gösta Tönne and Thore Ehrling. As a member of Ehrling's ensemble, he composed the piece "Mississippi Mood". He led a sextet in Stockholm in the 1950s and early 1960s, which played jazz as well as accompanying popular singers such as Bibi Johns; among its sidemen were Jan Allan and Rolf Billberg. He played with, among others, Harry Arnold, Roy Eldridge, Lars Gullin, Peanuts Holland, and Bjarne Nerem.

References
"Carl-Henrik Norin". The New Grove Dictionary of Jazz. 2nd edition, ed. Barry Kernfeld.

1920 births
1967 deaths
Swedish jazz saxophonists
Male saxophonists
Swedish jazz bandleaders
Swedish composers
Swedish male composers
20th-century saxophonists
20th-century Swedish male musicians
Male jazz musicians
20th-century Swedish musicians